Ewa Palies (born 30 January 1989) is a British handball player. She plays for the British national team, and competed at the 2012 Summer Olympics in London. She was born in Montpellier. At the time of her call up to the Olympic squad, she played club handball for Plan de Cuques and has a masters degree in chemistry.

References

External links

British female handball players
1989 births
Living people
Sportspeople from Montpellier
Handball players at the 2012 Summer Olympics
Olympic handball players of Great Britain